Yagna is a 2009 Indian Kannada-language film directed by Krishna Brahma, starring Sriimurali and Priyanka in the lead roles.

Cast

 Sriimurali as Anji
 Priyanka  as Yagna
 Sathya Prakash as Raj
 Jaya Prakash Reddy as Varadaraj
 Om Prakash Rao
 Venu Madhav
 M. S. Narayana

Music

Reception

Critical response 

A critic from The New Indian Express wrote "The suspense begins when Yagna’s friends start getting killed one by one. Anji kills Raj , a dejected lover, who used to frighten the bungalow’s inmates
In the climax, the director reveals that Anji is a police inspector who was assigned to investigate the mysterious deaths and Yagna is the owner of that bungalow.
If you manage to sit through this film, it will be a miracle". A critic from Rediff.com  scored the film at 1 out of 5 stars and says "Sree Murali once again proves that he is a good actor who unfortunately chooses the wrong films. He is good in the climax as well as in the fight sequences. Debutant Priyanka indulges in lot of skin show in the dance sequences. Om Prakash Rao's comedy gets to your nerves. Camera work of Niranjan Babu is passable while Sree Murali's music is very ordinary. All in all, a horror film you won't miss seeing". A critic from The Times of India  scored the film at 2 out of 5 stars and wrote "While Srimurali has given his best, Priyanka is impressive. Omprakash Rao shines. Camerawork by Niranjan is poor. The less said the better about music by Murali". A critic from Bangalore Mirror wrote "Deaths ensue and Aaji has the task of finding out the cause. Like in most such films, the climax reveals that various characters are not what actually they were made out to be. Disconnect between scenes, virtual absence of characterisation and bad narration makes Yagna a torture to watch".

References

2000s Kannada-language films
2009 films